Lars Ehrnrooth (17 June 1897 – 4 September 1980) was a Finnish equestrian. He competed in the individual eventing event at the 1924 Summer Olympics.

References

External links
 

1897 births
1980 deaths
Finnish male equestrians
Olympic equestrians of Finland
Equestrians at the 1924 Summer Olympics
People from Valkeala
Sportspeople from Kymenlaakso